The 2008 Nevada Republican presidential caucuses was held on January 19, the same day as the 2008 South Carolina Republican primary, with 31 delegates at stake. Mitt Romney was the winner in Nevada with 51% of the votes, with Ron Paul in second place. Half of Romney's votes came from Mormons, while two-thirds of the independent voters favored Paul. According to the Las Vegas Sun, Republicans crossed over in large numbers to vote Democratic; CNN exit polls indicated that Republican voters made up 4% of the Democratic caucus turnout.

Process
The Nevada Republican Party caucus is a closed caucus open to those who were registered 30 days before the caucus date, and 17-year-olds who are eligible to vote in the general election in November. As in most Republican caucuses, there are two components. First, delegates are elected from the attendees. These delegates represent the caucusgoers at the county conventions in March, and generally announce who they support for President, and why they should go to the county convention. Election of delegates is by show of hands. Then, a supporter of each campaign speaks on behalf of their candidate. Finally, a straw poll, called a presidential preference poll, is taken of the individuals in the room. This preference poll is a secret ballot with candidate names printed on them.

Although the news media report the results of the straw poll, and assigns delegates proportionally based on it, in Nevada it is the county conventions and the state convention which determine who actually goes to the Republican National Convention. Thus, all delegates are unbound until the state convention in April, although they generally will represent the preferences expressed by fellow Republicans in the straw poll.

Campaign
Republican candidate Mitt Romney campaigned hard in Nevada, while the other leading Republican candidates, John McCain and Mike Huckabee, focused on South Carolina during the run-up to January 19. The Republican party did not cut Nevada's delegates to the national convention in half; therefore, Nevada had more delegates at stake than South Carolina.  He was expected to benefit from Nevada's large Mormon population.

A poll ahead of the election predicted John McCain to win the election with 22 percent, followed by Rudy Giuliani (18 percent),
Mike Huckabee (16 percent), Mitt Romney (15 percent), Fred Thompson (11 percent) and Ron Paul (6 percent).

On January 17, Ron Paul's Nevada campaign representatives warned state GOP officials that thousands of caucus goers had been given incorrect information on where to go to caucus.  Party officials addressed the problem with a message on the Nevada GOP website that morning, two days before the caucus.

Results
Romney's win in Nevada extended the lead that he then held in total delegates.  After coming last in this caucus, Duncan Hunter withdrew his bid for the nomination.

Although delegates were not pledged to candidates until the state convention, the news media allocated delegates proportionally for reporting purposes.

See also
 Nevada Democratic caucuses, 2008
 Republican Party (United States) presidential primaries, 2008

References

Notes

External links
 Official website of Nevada Republican Caucus

Nevada
2008 Nevada elections
2008